Lichnanthe ursina, the bumblebee scarab, is a species of bumble bee scarab beetle in the family Glaphyridae. It is found in North America.

References

Further reading

 

Glaphyridae
Articles created by Qbugbot
Beetles described in 1861